So Fresh: The Hits of Spring 2010 is a compilation album in the So Fresh series. It was released on 10 September 2010.

Track listing
Enrique Iglesias featuring Pitbull – "I Like It" (3:53)
Taio Cruz – "Dynamite" (3:23)
Usher featuring Pitbull – "DJ Got Us Fallin' in Love" (3:42)
Kesha – "Take It Off" (3:35)
Michael Paynter and The Veronicas – "Love the Fall" (3:00)
Vanessa Amorosi – "Holiday" (3:18)
Rihanna featuring Slash – "Rockstar 101" (4:00)
Stan Walker – "Choose You" (3:38)
Train – "If It's Love" (3:51)
Amy Meredith – "Young at Heart" (3:52)
Ou Est le Swimming Pool – "Dance the Way I Feel" (3:27)
Justin Bieber – "Somebody to Love" (3:41)
Mike Posner – "Cooler than Me" (3:34)
Gyroscope – "Baby, I'm Gettin' Better" (3:19)
The Potbelleez – "Hello" (3:29)
Alexandra Burke featuring Pitbull – "All Night Long" (3:48)
Maroon 5 – "Misery" (3:27)
Dane Rumble – "Always Be Here" (3:45)
Hayley Warner – "Hands Off" (2:36)
Ed Kowalczyk – "Grace" (3:14)

DVD
Taio Cruz – "Dynamite"
Kesha – "Take It Off"
Michael Paynter and The Veronicas – "Love the Fall"
Vanessa Amorosi – "Holiday"
Rihanna featuring Slash – "Rockstar 101"
Train – "If It's Love"
Amy Meredith – "Young at Heart"
Ou Est Le Swimming Pool – "Dance the Way I Feel"
Mike Posner – "Cooler Than Me"
Gyroscope – "Baby, I'm Gettin' Better"
Alexandra Burke featuring Pitbull – "All Night Long"
Maroon 5 – "Misery"
Charlie Winston - "In Your Hands"

Charts

Year-end charts

Certifications

References 

2010 compilation albums
So Fresh albums
2010 in Australian music